Brilliant blue is a shade of blue, or may refer to:

Color
 RAL 5007 brilliant blue, an RAL color

Chemicals
 Brilliant blue FCF, a dye
 Brilliant cresyl blue, a stain used in microscopy
 Coomassie brilliant blue, a dye
 Remazol Brilliant Blue R, a dye

Entertainment
 "Brilliant Blue", a side B song on the single "Kyū Jō Show!!" by the Kanjani Eight
 Brilliant Blue (manga), a manga
 Daphne in the Brilliant Blue, a manga and television series

Butterflies
 Junonia rhadama, a butterfly of islands in the Indian Ocean
 Lepidochrysops asteris, a butterfly of South Africa